Jacopo Scaccabarozzi (born 18 November 1994) is an Italian professional footballer who plays as a midfielder for  club Juve Stabia.

Career
Born in Lecco, Scaccabarozzi started his senior career in Serie D club Olginatese at 16.

In August 2013, he moved to Lega Pro Seconda Divisione club Renate. The club won the promotion to Serie C this season. He played four years for the club, three in Serie C.

In July 2017, he joined to Piacenza. In January 2018, Jacopo returned to Renate at loan.

On 23 July 2018, he was loaned to Vibonese.

On 18 July 2019, Scaccabarozzi signed with Lecco.

On 31 August 2020, he moved to Juve Stabia, in Serie C.

References

External links
 
 

1994 births
Living people
Sportspeople from Lecco
Footballers from Lombardy
Italian footballers
Association football midfielders
Serie C players
Lega Pro Seconda Divisione players
Serie D players
U.S.D. Olginatese players
A.C. Renate players
Piacenza Calcio 1919 players
U.S. Vibonese Calcio players
Calcio Lecco 1912 players
S.S. Juve Stabia players